= Thomas Perstedt =

Swedish footballer

Personal information
- Date of birth: 25 February 1969 (age 57)
- Place of birth: Sweden
- Height: 1.90 m (6 ft 3 in)
- Position: Goalkeeper

Senior career*
Years	Team	Apps	(Gls)
1999–2002	Örgryte IS	31	(0)
- * Club domestic league appearances and goals

Thomas Perstedt (born 25 February 1969) is a Swedish former professional footballer who played as a goalkeeper for Örgryte IS in the Allsvenskan.
